Ostrówek  is a settlement in the administrative district of Gmina Wilczyn, within Konin County, Greater Poland Voivodeship, near central Poland.

References

Villages in Konin County